Oukaïmeden Observatory (obs. code: J43) is an astronomical observatory located in the commune of Oukaïmden in the Atlas Mountains of Morocco, where the Morocco Oukaimeden Sky Survey is conducted to observe small Solar System bodies.

Telescope 
Located in the Atlas Mountains, 2750 meters above sea level, the TRAPPIST-North telescope is a twin telescope of TRAPPIST-South located at the La Silla Observatory in Chile, both operated from Liège, Belgium, by the Space Center of the University of Liège.

Discovery 
In May 2016, data from the telescopes helped identify TRAPPIST-1.

See also 
 
 Rabat Observatory

References 

Astronomical observatories in Morocco
Buildings and structures in Marrakesh-Safi
Minor-planet discovering observatories